Derrek Tuszka (born July 11, 1996) is an American football outside linebacker for the Los Angeles Chargers of the National Football League (NFL). He played college football at North Dakota State.

Early life
Tuszka attended Warner High School in Warner, South Dakota. He committed to North Dakota State on April 22, 2014.

College career
Tuszka played college football at North Dakota State where he was a three-year starter. As a senior in 2019, he recorded 48 tackles including 19 tackles for loss, 13.5 sacks, one forced fumble, and five passes defensed. Tuszka was named an FCS first-team All-American as well as the Missouri Valley Football Conference Defensive Player of the Year. In his collegiate career he started 34 of the 53 games in which he appeared and compiled 133 tackles, 42 tackles for loss, 29.5 sacks, three forced fumbles, and six passes defensed.

Professional career

Denver Broncos
Tuszka was selected by the Denver Broncos with the 254th overall pick in the seventh round of the 2020 NFL Draft. He was waived on September 5, 2020, and was signed to the practice squad the following day. He was elevated to the active roster on September 14 for the team's week 1 game against the Tennessee Titans, and reverted to the practice squad the next day. He was elevated again on September 19 for the team's week 2 game against the Pittsburgh Steelers, and reverted to the practice squad again after the game. He was promoted to the active roster on September 30, 2020. He was placed on injured reserve on October 27, 2020, with a hamstring injury. On December 12, 2020, Tuszka was activated off of injured reserve.

On August 31, 2021, Tuszka was waived by the Broncos.

Pittsburgh Steelers
On September 1, 2021, Tuszka was signed to the Pittsburgh Steelers practice squad. He was promoted on September 28, 2021. He was released on September 1, 2022.

Tennessee Titans
On September 2, 2022, Tuszka was claimed off waivers by the Tennessee Titans. He was waived on September 26.

Los Angeles Chargers
On September 28, 2022, Tuszka was claimed off waivers by the Los Angeles Chargers.

References

External links
Denver Broncos bio
North Dakota State Bison bio

1996 births
Living people
People from Brown County, South Dakota
Players of American football from South Dakota
American football linebackers
North Dakota State Bison football players
Denver Broncos players
Pittsburgh Steelers players
Tennessee Titans players
Los Angeles Chargers players